Binodanand Jha (17 April 1900 – 1971), also known as Pandit Binodanand Jha was an Indian politician originally from the district of Deoghar, Bihar (Baidyanathdham Deoghar), now in Jharkhand. He was educated at the Central Calcutta College, (now Maulana Azad College) under the University of Calcutta. He was the Chief Minister of Bihar from February 1961 to October 1963. He was elected to the 5th Lok Sabha, lower house of the Parliament of India from the Darbhanga constituency of Bihar in 1971. He was a member of the Constituent Assembly of India in 1948 from Bihar.

References

External links
Official biographical sketch in Parliament of India website

Chief Ministers of Bihar
India MPs 1971–1977
1900 births
People from Bihar
Year of death missing
Maulana Azad College alumni
University of Calcutta alumni
Lok Sabha members from Bihar
Members of the Constituent Assembly of India
People from Deoghar district
People from Darbhanga district
Chief ministers from Indian National Congress
Indian National Congress politicians from Bihar